Eucilinus aridus is a species of broad-nosed weevil in the beetle family Curculionidae. It is found in North America.

Subspecies
These two subspecies belong to the species Eucilinus aridus:
 Eucilinus aridus aridus g
 Eucilinus aridus tinkhami (Tanner, 1959) c g
Data sources: i = ITIS, c = Catalogue of Life, g = GBIF, b = Bugguide.net

References

Further reading

 
 

Entiminae
Articles created by Qbugbot
Beetles described in 1938